Tokorua is an island of the Gambier Islands of French Polynesia.  The name means "companion, mate" (or two – as it does in Māori) in the local Mangareva language.

See also

 Desert island
 List of islands

References

Islands of the Gambier Islands
Uninhabited islands of French Polynesia